These are the results of the men's K-2 1000 metres competition in canoeing at the 1936 Summer Olympics.  The K-2 event is raced by two-man canoe sprint kayaks. Heats and final took place on Saturday, August 8.

Twenty-four canoeists from twelve nations competed.

Medalists

Results

Heats
The 12 teams first raced in two heats.  The top four teams in each heat advanced directly to the final.

Heat 1

Heat 2

Final

Jannson and Lundqvist originally finished second, but were disqualified for bumping into Tilker and Bondroit.

References
1936 Summer Olympics Official Report Volume 2. p. 1022.
Sports Reference.com 1936 K-2 1000 m results. - accessed September 1, 2008.
Wallechinsky, David and Jaime Loucky (2008). "Canoeing: Men's Kayak Pairs: 1000 Meters". In The Complete Book of the Olympics: 2008 Edition. London: Aurum Press, Limited. p. 474.

Men's K-2 1000